Alfredo Rodríguez Salicio (born October 7, 1985) is a Cuban composer and jazz pianist.

Rodríguez's interest in jazz was stimulated by the annual "JoJazz" competition for young jazz musicians, where he won an honorable mention in 2003.

Influences and playing style
A 2009 reviewer suggested that Rodríguez was "more a melding of Bill Evans, Kenny Werner, Fred Hersch, even touches of Thelonious Monk in conception if not execution, [with] hints here and there of his Cuban heritage".

Another critic in the same year wrote that, "In one tune, his crisp bebop lines recalled Bill Evans' early playing on the George Russell mid-fifties Jazz Workshop album. Other pieces suggested the melodic inventiveness of Keith Jarrett. And still others displayed a nascent style of his own, contrasting angular, leaping passages and thick harmonic clusters with sudden, unexpected arcs of lyricism".

Discography

References

External links 
 Official Alfredo Rodríguez Website
 Mack Avenue Artist Page

Cuban jazz pianists
Cuban classical pianists
1985 births
Living people
People from Havana
21st-century classical pianists
Mack Avenue Records artists